Callicera is a Holarctic genus of hoverflies

Medium-sized to rather large (wing length 9·75–15 mm.) bumblebee mimics. They are beautiful metallic flies, with strikingly long antennae. All the species are considered rare. Callicera larvae live in water rot-holes of overmature trees as saprophages. They occur mainly in ancient forests where they are arboreal.

Callicera have been used as bioindicators.

Species
C. aenea (Fabricius, 1781)
C. aurata (Rossi, 1790)
 C.christiani  (Ghorpade, 1982)
 C.doleschalli (Verrall, 1913)
C. duncani Curran, 1935
C. erratica (Walker, 1849)
C. exigua Smit, 2014
C. fagesii Guérin-Menéville, 1844
C. macquarti Rondani, 1844
C. montensis Snow, 1892
 C. nitens (Coe, 1964)
 C.poultoni (Verrall, 1913)
 C.robusta (Coe, 1964)
C. rohdendorfi Zimina, 1982
C. rufa Schummel, 1842
 C.sackeni (Verrall, 1913)
C. scintilla Smit, 2014
C. spinolae Rondani, 1844
C. sumatrensis (Meijere, 1919)

References

External images
Images representing Callicera

Hoverfly genera
Eristalinae
Taxa named by Georg Wolfgang Franz Panzer